"Sunday" is a song by Schiller, with vocals by Despina Vandi. It is the first single and included on the Schiller's album Breathless, the international version of Schiller's album Atemlos. The song is written and produced by both Phoebus and Schiller. It is the second international collaboration between Despina Vandi and German band Schiller. The first one was the song Destiny, in 2008.

Release history
Until now the album Breathless has already released in Czech Republic and Slovakia. Also, it released in Russia on the end of May and later is going to be released in England, USA and China. In May 2010 the album released in Greece. The song is also included on Despina Vandi's album C'est La Vie. An exclusive version of Sunday by Schiller is also included on the revised edition of the C'est La Vie album in Greece. That version will also included in the revised version of the album Breathless on January 4, 2011. On October 2, 2010, announced that the Sunday will also included on the new Schiller's album Lichtblick, which will be released on November 26, 2010. The album Breathless reached until number 10 in the chart of IFPI in Greece.

References

2010 singles
Despina Vandi songs
Songs written by Phoebus (songwriter)
2010 songs
Songs written by Christopher von Deylen